Zhang Guowei may refer to:

Zhang Guowei (runner) (born 1959), Chinese long-distance runner
Zhang Guowei (high jumper) (born 1991), Chinese high jumper